"Hey! Say!" is the first single from the temporary group Hey! Say! 7, which later became Hey! Say! JUMP. The songs "Hey! Say!" and "BON BON" are both opening and ending themes for the anime Lovely Complex.

The single is released in two editions: limited and regular. The limited edition comes with a DVD that includes the promotional video and making of. However, the limited edition does not include instrumental or karaoke. The regular edition does, but does not come with a DVD.

Regular Edition
CD
 "Hey! Say!"
 "BON BON"
 "I wo Kure (Iをくれ)"
 "Hey! Say!" (Instrumental)
 "BON BON" (Instrumental)
 "I wo Kure (Iをくれ)" (Instrumental)

Limited Edition
CD
 "Hey! Say!"
 "BON BON"
 "I wo Kure (Iをくれ)"
 "Hey!Say!" (Instrumental)
 "BON BON" (Instrumental)
 "I wo Kure (Iをくれ)" (Instrumental)

DVD
 "Hey! Say!" (PV & Making of)

Performances
 2007-07-13 - Music Station
 2007-07-27 - Music Station
 2007-08-01 - Music Station

Charts

Oricon sales chart (Japan)

Oricon Ranking (Monthly)

2007 debut singles
Hey! Say! JUMP songs
Oricon Weekly number-one singles
2007 songs
J Storm singles